The Alfalfa mosaic virus (AMV) coat protein binding (CPB) RNA is an RNA element which is found in the 3′ UTR of the genome. AMV CPB can stimulate the translation of AMV RNA by between 50 and 100-fold. This family contains at least two coat protein binding sites which are thought to be essential for efficient RNA translation.

See also 
 Alfalfa mosaic virus RNA 1 5′ UTR stem-loop

References

External links 
 

Cis-regulatory RNA elements
Bromoviridae